Brunswick Street is a main thoroughfare within the suburbs of New Farm and Fortitude Valley (known locally as the Valley) in Brisbane, Australia. The street is not entirely roadway but is a pedestrian mall for a hundred metres near its centre.

It is known as the major nightclub precinct in Brisbane, having many bars and clubs as well as restaurants located along its length. The Valley Mall is expanding with new clubs such as The Met, Alleoneword, X&Y, Cloudland and Planet adding to the established Empire Hotel, Family, Monastery and GPO as well as many others.  The McWhirters department store is situated on the corner of the Brunswick Street mall and Wickham Street.

One street to the west adjacent to the mall is their Chinatown.  The heritage listed Corbett and Son Store and Coronet Flats were built along the street. The street is used for the Queensland Pride rally and march.

Major intersections

 Gregory Terrace
 Water Street
 St Pauls Terrace
 Wickham Street
 Ann Street
 McLachlan Street
 Harcourt Street
 Kent Street
 Merthyr Road
 Oxlade Drive

Heritage listings
Brunswick Street has a number of heritage-listed sites, including:
 McWhirters
 323–335 Brunswick Street: Royal George Hotel and Ruddle's Building
 339 Brunswick Street: Empire Hotel
 446-452 Brunswick Street: former Corbett and Son Store
 483 Brunswick Street: Fortitude Valley Primitive Methodist Church
 517 Brunswick Street: La Scala
 701 Brunswick Street: New Farm Cinemas
 New Farm Park
 Coronet Flats

See also

 List of road routes in Queensland

References

External links

Streets in Brisbane
Restaurant districts and streets in Australia
New Farm, Queensland
Fortitude Valley, Queensland